Sir Richard Reynell, 2nd Baronet (1673–1723) was an Anglo-Irish politician,  barrister and landowner who sat in the Irish House of Commons as member for Wicklow from 1692 to 1693.

He was the elder son of Sir Richard Reynell, 1st Baronet and his wife Hester Beckett, daughter of Randall Beckett of Dublin. He was probably born in Dublin, where his father spent most of his career. The elder Sir Richard was in turn member of the House of Commons for Athboy, judge of the Court of King's Bench (Ireland) and finally Lord Chief Justice of Ireland. The Reynells were an ancient Devon family with strong links to East Ogwell and Ashburton, Devon; after the Glorious Revolution the elder Sir Richard sat in the House of Commons of England for Ashburton. The younger Richard was elected to the Irish House of Commons for Wicklow in 1692, when he was barely 20 years old; he was also like his father a practising barrister. His father's mental health failed: he was removed from office in 1695 and retired to England; from then on the family largely severed their ties with Ireland, apart from the second baronet's younger brother Henry, a barrister in Dublin.

The younger Richard married his cousin Elizabeth, daughter of Thomas Reynell of Laleham, Middlesex and Anne Balam. Elizabeth died in 1706, aged thirty-nine. They had three daughters, Hester Reynell who married Christopher Carleton, Anne Jemima who married firstly Edward Bray and then secondly Abraham Dumaresq of the Hon. East India Company, and Catherine who married William Harvest, and one son Sir Thomas Reynell, 3rd Baronet. 

Sir Richard Reynell, the 3rd Baronet, died at Laleham in June 1723. In contrast to his father, who was described as one of the most remarkable figures in Irish political life of his time, the second Sir Richard has left little mark on history.

References

1673 births
1723 deaths
Baronets in the Baronetage of Ireland
Members of the Parliament of Ireland (pre-1801) for County Wicklow constituencies
Irish MPs 1692–1693
Richard